Quan Minyu (or Jun Min-woo, ; ; 2004 – February 9, 2016), known as Little Psy, was a Chinese child singer and dancer of Korean descent. He became well known in China and South Korea after he impersonated Psy in the fourth season of Chinese Dream Show. Quan was diagnosed with DIPG in 2014 and died at the age of 12 on February 9, 2016.

References 

2004 births
2016 deaths
Chinese child singers
Chinese dance musicians
Chinese male dancers
Chinese pop singers
Chinese people of Korean descent
People from Yanbian
Deaths from brain tumor
21st-century Chinese male singers